Mayo West was a parliamentary constituency represented in Dáil Éireann, the lower house of the Irish parliament or Oireachtas from 1969 to 1997. The constituency was served by 3 deputies (Teachtaí Dála, commonly known in English as TDs). The method of election was proportional representation by means of the single transferable vote (PR-STV).

History and boundaries 
The constituency was created under the terms of the Electoral (Amendment) Act 1969, taking in parts of the former Mayo North and Mayo South constituencies, and included Ballinrobe, Belmullet, Castlebar and Westport. With effect from the 1997 general election it was combined with Mayo East to form a new five-seat Mayo constituency.

TDs

Elections

1994 by-election 
Following the resignation of Fianna Fáil TD Pádraig Flynn on his appointment as EU Commissioner, a by-election was held on 9 June 1994. The seat was won by the Fine Gael candidate Michael Ring.

1992 general election

1989 general election

1987 general election

November 1982 general election

February 1982 general election

1981 general election

1977 general election

1975 by-election 
Following the death of Fine Gael TD Henry Kenny, a by-election was held on 12 November 1975. The seat was won by the Fine Gael candidate Enda Kenny, son of the deceased TD.

1973 general election

1969 general election

See also 
Dáil constituencies
Politics of the Republic of Ireland
Historic Dáil constituencies
Elections in the Republic of Ireland

References

External links 
Oireachtas Members Database

Historic constituencies in County Mayo
Dáil constituencies in the Republic of Ireland (historic)
1969 establishments in Ireland
1997 disestablishments in Ireland
Constituencies established in 1969
Constituencies disestablished in 1997